Veronika Freimanová (born 24 September 1955 in Prague) is a Czech stage, television and film actress. Freimanová is a graduate of Prague Conservatory and currently acts at Divadlo Bez zábradlí.

Filmography
 Sněženky a machři (1983)
 Snowboarďáci (2004)
 Rafťáci (2006)
 Vyprávěj (2012)

References

1955 births
Czech film actresses
Czech stage actresses
Czech television actresses
Actresses from Prague
Living people
Prague Conservatory alumni